Mladen III Šubić ( 1315 – Trogir, 1 May 1348) was a member of the Croatian Šubić noble family, who ruled from Klis Fortress. He was in possession of Klis, Omiš and Skradin. He is also known as Shield of the Croats (clipeus Croatorum), according to the Latin epitaph in verse on his grave in Trogir.

Ruler
He formally succeeded his father Juraj II Šubić upon his early death, though the territories were initially controlled by his mother Lelka until he reached adulthood in 1332. She continued to have considerable influence on his politics afterwards. He successfully warred against the coalition of Dalmatian cities Split, Trogir and Šibenik under Republic of Venice and the nobility under Duke of Knin, Ivan Nelipić, whom he pressured to return Ostrovica in 1335. He also strengthened his position by ousting opposition of Ivan Jurišić, Budislav Ugrinić and Hran Gradinić within his clan either through military or diplomatic means. He later also allowed his uncle Paul II to secede as the Prince of Ostrovica.

He was the famous Šubić from Klis, but regardless of the diplomatic and dynastic success, Mladen III could not save Šubić family from its eventual fall, because he was almost only one left to defend it, and following the death of Ivan Nelipić, became the principal opposition to the Hungarian king in 1344.

To oppose the Hungarian king he made various alliances. First he warred and eventually made an alliance with Stephen II, Ban of Bosnia in 1338, confirmed by marrying his sister Jelena Šubić (died c. 1378) to Regent of Bosnia Vladislav Kotromanić, and Jelena gave birth to the first Bosnian king, Tvrtko I. He neutrally allied with the Republic of Venice during Siege of Zadar (1345–1346), marrying younger brother Paul III to a Venetian noblewoman, and took the title of Marquess of Slavonia (meaning "Croatia") in 1348, with the intention of overthrowing royal power of Louis I of Hungary over rest of Croatia. He also married in 1347 Jelena Nemanjić, half-sister of the Serbian emperor Stefan Dušan who had bad relations with Hungary. 

However, the anti-Hungarian plans suddenly stopped as Mladen III died on 1 May 1348, from the Black Death. He was buried in the Cathedral of St. Lawrence in Trogir.

The aftermath
After Mladen's death, a great political and military struggle for control over Klis Fortress arose.

 Catherine Dandolo the wife of his brother Pavao III Šubić and relative of doge Andrea Dandolo wanted the fortress for Venetians.
 Jelena Nemanjić Šubić (his wife-widow) wanted the fortress for her half-brother Stefan Dušan of Serbia.
 Jelena Šubić (his sister) wanted the fortress for her son Tvrtko I of Bosnia.

After several diplomatic games and battles between the armies, Klis and other cities by 1355 temporary fell again into hands of king Louis I of Hungary. Previously, with the death of Paul II Šubić and 1347 arrangement of Gregory II in the name Paul II's son George III with the king, Šubić family also lost secondary stronghold Ostrovica in exchange for Zrin Castle, by which name the prominent Zrinski family branch will become known.

Family
Mladen III Šubić was probably oldest son of Juraj II Šubić and grandson of Pavao I Šubić Bribirski, who was the most powerful Croatian noble at the end of the thirteenth century and beginning of the fourteenth century.

Mladen III Šubić had two children.
 Mladen IV Šubić
 Katharina Šubić of Croatia (? –1358) who married Piast Duke of Legnica-Brzeg Bolesław III the Generous in 1326.

Grave epitaph

See also
 Šubić family
 Klis Fortress

References

Šubić
Subic
Subic
1348 deaths
Year of birth uncertain
14th-century deaths from plague (disease)